Eana osseana, common name dotted shade, is a moth of the  family Tortricidae.

Description
Eana osseana has a wingspan reaching . The basic coloration is pale brown, with a few obscure brown markings.Meyrick describes it - Forewings
very elongate, costa almost straight, termen slightly sinuate brownish-ochreous, sometimes ferruginous-tinged, seldom whitish- ochreous ; an irregular spot in disc before and another
beyond middle, and a triangular apical patch fuscous, often indistinct or sometimes obsolete. Hindwings grey.
 
Adults fly from June to August and they are attracted to light. The larvae live within a silken tube. They are polyphagous, feeding on many herbaceous plants, grasses and mosses.

Distribution and habitat
This species is widespread in most of Europe, in the East Palearctic realm and in the Nearctic realm. It prefers grassland, downland and moorland.

References

 Scopoli, J. A. (1763): Entomologia Carniolica exhibens insecta Carnioliae indigena et distributa in ordines, genera, species, varietates. Methodo Linnaeana. 1-421. Vindobonae

External links
 Fauna Europaea
 UKMoths
 Suffolk moths
 Hantsmoths

Moths described in 1763
Cnephasiini
Taxa named by Giovanni Antonio Scopoli